Chittaranjan Mahata also known as Chitta Mahato was an Indian politician. He was elected to the Lok Sabha, the lower house of the Parliament of India from the Purulia in West Bengal as a member of the All India Forward Bloc.

References

External links
Official biographical sketch in Parliament of India website

1937 births
All India Forward Bloc politicians
People from Purulia district
India MPs 1977–1979
India MPs 1980–1984
India MPs 1984–1989
India MPs 1989–1991
India MPs 1991–1996
Lok Sabha members from West Bengal
Living people